Rowland is a village and a civil parish in the Derbyshire Dales District, in the English county of Derbyshire. It is near the larger village of Great Longstone (where the population is included). Rowland lies within the chapelry of Baslow. Rowland is within the Peak District National Park.

See also
Listed buildings in Rowland, Derbyshire

References 
 Genuki

External links 

Civil parishes in Derbyshire
Villages in Derbyshire
Derbyshire Dales
Towns and villages of the Peak District